Black & White is the second album by The Maine and was released on July 13, 2010. The album features singles "Inside of You" and "Growing Up". It debuted at No. 16 on the Billboard 200 with 22,634 copies sold in its first week.

Background
In July 2009, it was announced that the group had recently signed to major label Warner Bros. Records.

Recording
Recorded in California with producer Howard Benson, Black & White sees The Maine stepping out of their comfort zone and creating a cohesive body of work that is an "album", in the most traditional sense of the word.

"This time we really wanted to focus on the songwriting and make sure all the songs were great so no matter where on the disc you are you can tell it's an album instead of a bunch of songs that are thrown together", drummer Pat Kirch explains. Acoustic versions of the songs "Inside of You" and "Right Girl" can be found on YouTube as well as the deluxe version of the record.

Release
On the release date of the album, July 13, the band and their crew embarked on an entire 24-hour event which had been streamed live via their MySpace page, Ustream, and website. Everyone who viewed the event online had chances to win some prizes, see acoustic sets, and also receive calls from the band through their "Say Now" account. "Inside of You" was released on the band's website as a promotional single and later announced as the first official single off the album on May 3, 2010, shortly after it had been uploaded as a lyrics video on their official YouTube page. A music video for "Inside of You", directed by Mike Jones and Jim Sullos, was released on July 19, 2010. "Growing Up" was released on May 17, 2010 as the second single for the album.

"Right Girl" was released as the first promotional single from the album, peaking at number 25 on the Billboard Rock Digital Song Sales chart on the week of July 31, 2010. A music video for the song was released on November 24. In March, the group went on a tour of the UK. "Don't Stop Now" was released as a free download through the group's Facebook profile. A video for "Listen to Your Heart" premiered via PureVolume on July 1. Throughout July, the group released a multi-part documentary about the making of the album.

Critical reception 

Black & White received mixed to positive reviews. Tim Sendra of AllMusic stated that the album had "a more mature and measured approach." He complimented songs like "Fuel to the Fire" and "Right Girl", however was a lot more critical of the overall album stating, "the record and the band lack the kind of individuality that will really hook people. Black & White sounds more like a genetically engineered record than the organic work of a bunch of guys who really care about what they are doing." Billboard said, "Black & White, finds the five-piece indulging in guitar pop-driven love anthems, mixed with a splash of ’80s hair band flare." Sean Reid of Alter the Press! stated, "It's a record that has decent hooks and catchy lyrics but other then that, there isn't much to shout about."

The album won the Alternative Press "Album of the Year" award in 2010.

Track listing 

Bonus tracks

Personnel 
 Members
 John O'Callaghan - lead vocals, piano
 Jared Monaco – lead guitar
 Kennedy Brock – rhythm guitar, vocals
 Garrett Nickelsen – bass guitar
 Pat Kirch – drums, percussion

 Production
Craig Aaronson – A&R
Keith Armstrong – Mixing assistant
Howard Benson – producer
Martin Briley – composer
Dana Calitri – composer
Chris Concepcion – technical assistance
David Bassett – composer
Paul DeCarli – digital editing
Hatsukazu "Hatch" Inagaki – engineer
Nik Karpen – mixing assistant
Tim Kirch – art conception
Chris Lord-Alge – mixing
Dirk Mai – art conception, photography

The Maine – art conception, composer, primary artist
Zac Maloy – composer
Jon Nicholson – drum technician
Nina Ossoff – composer
Donny Phillips – art conception, art direction, design
Mike Plotnikoff – engineer
Xavier Ramos – marketing
Michito Sánchez – percussion
Andrew Schubert - mixing
Brad Townsend – mixing
Marc VanGool – guitar, guitar technician
Butch Walker – composer
Gregg Wattenburg – composer
Mark Weinburg – composer

Charts

References

External links

Black & White (deluxe) at YouTube (streamed copy where licensed)

2010 albums
The Maine (band) albums
Warner Records albums